Vidmar is a 9th most frequent Slovene surname, the name can also be found in Croatia. In Slovenia, it is present throughout the country, but it is most common in central and southern Slovenia, as well as in parts of the Slovenian Littoral.

Vidmar may refer to:

People

 Andrej Vidmar (born 1956), Yugoslav ice hockey player
 Aurelio Vidmar (born 1967), Australian soccer player and manager
 Gašper Vidmar (born 1987), Slovenian basketball player
 Igor Vidmar (born 1950), Slovenian journalist, activist, and music producer
 Ivan Vidmar, aviation pioneer
 Janja Vidmar (born 1962), Slovenian author and screenwriter
 John Vidmar, American theologian
 Josip Vidmar (1895–1992), Slovenian littérateur and politician
 Jože Vidmar (born 1963), Slovenian canoeist
 Luka Vidmar (born 1986), Slovenian ice hockey player
 Maja Vidmar (born 1961), Slovenian poet
 Maja Vidmar (climber) (born 1985), Slovenian rock climber
 Meta Vidmar (1899–1975), Slovenian dancer
 Milan Vidmar (Senior, 1885–1962), Slovenian electrical engineer, chess grandmaster
 Milan Vidmar, Jr. (1909–1980), Slovenian electrical engineer, chess player; son of Milan
 Nejc Vidmar (born 1989), Slovenian football player
 Peter Vidmar (born 1961), American gymnast
 Tony Vidmar (born 1970), Australian soccer player

Businesses
 Vidmar is a US-based industrial storage company owned by Stanley Black & Decker, bought by Stanley Works in 1966.

References 

Slovene-language surnames